John McGillivray may refer to:

 John McGillivray (fur trader) (c. 1770–1855), member of the Legislative Council of Upper Canada
 John Alexander McGillivray (1853–1911), member of the Canadian Parliament for Ontario North
 John McGillivray (footballer) (1886–1977), English footballer

See also
John McGilvrey (1867–1945), American academic and first president of Kent State University